is a fictional character who first appeared in the 1989 arcade beat-em-up Final Fight by Capcom. Guy, along with other Final Fight series characters, has also been a recurring player character in the Street Fighter fighting game series since Street Fighter Alpha: Warriors' Dreams in 1995. Guy is a crimson-clad ninpō master of Japanese descent who has been taught the  form of ninjutsu. The kanji, 武神, written on Guy's top literally translates to "God of War".

Guy was excluded from the SNES version of the game, but a special version replacing Cody with Guy was also released. While he is not a playable character in the sequel Final Fight 2, Guy factors into the storyline as his girlfriend and her father are captured. Guy returned to the Final Fight series as selectable character in Final Fight 3. He also appears in Final Fight: Streetwise, but is not playable in the game's story mode. His sister-in-law is Maki Genryusai, who was introduced as one of the protagonists of Final Fight 2.

The character has been well received, often being named to various lists of top Street Fighter characters. His popularity with fans has resulted in Capcom adding him to many of its newer fighting games.

Appearances

In video games

Final Fight
Guy is one of three playable characters, along with Cody and Mike Haggar, in the original arcade version of Final Fight, released for the arcades by Capcom in 1989. In the backstory of the original Final Fight, Guy is established to be the 39th successor of the Bushin-style Ninpo. He aides his friend Cody as well as Metro City Mayor Mike Haggar in rescuing Jessica, who is Haggar's daughter and Cody's girlfriend, from the Mad Gear gang.

Due to space constraint, Guy was initially omitted from the SNES port of the game, with Cody and Haggar being the only playable characters in that version. Capcom later produced a second SNES version titled Final Fight Guy, which replaced Cody's character with that of Guy (who is the only character featured in the game's cover art). Later versions of the game such as Final Fight CD for Sega CD and Final Fight One for the Game Boy Advance would include all three characters. Capcom also produced an NES game titled Mighty Final Fight, a parody of the original Final Fight which features all three characters.

Capcom later released Final Fight 2 in 1993, a sequel created specifically for the SNES. In this installment, Guy's sensei, Genryusai and his daughter Rena (Guy's fiancee), are kidnapped by the new incarnation of Mad Gear. In the game's story, Guy is off on a training mission and is unable to rescue his fiancee and master. Instead, the game features Guy's sister-in-law, Maki Genryusai, who has also been trained in the same fighting style, and Carlos Miyamoto, a South American swordsman. Guy only makes an appearance in the end of the game, although the game does feature power-up icons shaped after his character.

In Final Fight 3, released in 1995, Guy finally returns to Metro City and teams up with Haggar to rid Metro City of the Skull Cross gang, the latest gang to try to pick up where Mad Gear had left off. They are joined by Metro City SCU officer Lucia Morgan and former gang member who double crossed the gang, Dean (who wanted revenge when Skull Cross murdered his family). The four succeed, and are able to rid Metro City of the criminals. Metro City is left in shambles, but Guy does not seem to care, and leaves that to Haggar.

In 1998, Guy was featured in Final Fight Revenge, the American-produced fighting game for the arcades and Sega Saturn. In 2006, the second American-produced Final Fight sequel, Final Fight: Streetwise, a reimagined Guy's character as a Japanese crime lord in the Japan Town district of Metro City.

Street Fighter
When Capcom produced the original Street Fighter Alpha in 1995, Guy would be one of two Final Fight characters to be included in the game along with the game's second stage boss Sodom. He was selected for inclusion because of his high popularity at the time. Guy and Sodom would be joined by Rolento in 1996's Street Fighter Alpha 2 and by Cody in 1998's Street Fighter Alpha 3, followed by Maki's appearance in the portable versions of Alpha 3. In the Alpha games, Guy's Bushin predecessor is revealed to be a man named Zeku, who would appear in Guy's ending in Street Fighter Alpha 2 to test Guy for his successor-ship. Zeku's presence in the game contradicts Final Fight 2, which identifies Genryusai as Guy's sensei, as designers of the Alpha games did not take into account the SNES Final Fight sequels when developing the games. Zeku was mentioned once again in Guy's bio in Street Fighter Alpha 3.

In Street Fighter IV, Guy was one of the new characters added in Super Street Fighter IV. In his ending, he is shown rescuing an unconscious Rose from Bison. In Rose's ending it is hinted that he might be the only one powerful enough to stop Bison (though in Street Fighter V, Bison is destroyed once and for all by Ryu), and in Cody's ending Guy is shown trying to persuade him to come back on the right side of the law. Guy is also the one who threw the kunai in Fei Long's ending in the original Street Fighter IV, since Ibuki has no involvement with S.I.N.

Crossover games
Guy is as a playable character in Capcom Fighting Jam, a crossover fighting game also featuring characters from Darkstalkers and Red Earth. Guy is a playable character in the Japan-only tactical role-playing game Namco × Capcom, in which he is paired with Sho (Ginzu) from Captain Commando as a single unit, the in-game story depicting Sho as his future Bushin-ryu successor. He also appears as a playable character via DLC (actually contained on the game disc) in the Tekken and Street Fighter series' crossover fighting game Street Fighter X Tekken, in which also Tekken'''s Raven can be dressed in Guy's costume.

In other media
Guy appears in the American Street Fighter animated series in an episode titled "Final Fight", which adapts the plot of its namesake. In this episode, Guy and Cody befriend Ryu and Ken, who aid them in fighting the Mad Gear Gang to save Jessica. He also makes an appearance in Street Fighter Alpha: The Animation as one of the warriors who have agreed to accompany Ryu, Ken and Chun-Li to Professor Sadler's base and rescue Shun, Ryu's alleged brother. As the fighters battle each other outside Sadler's base to demonstrate their skills, Guy fights Dhalsim. When Sadler's true intentions are revealed, Guy and the other fighters are freed by Ken and Chun-Li.

Guy makes an appearance in UDON's Street Fighter II Turbo comic, in which he was given an invitation to fight in the Japanese branch of the Street Fighter Tournament by M. Bison. Dan tries to take Guy's invitation from him by force, yet is quickly defeated. At night, Dan breaks into Guy's house and steals his invitation; Guy witnesses the whole event, but decides to give Dan a chance, as he was not planning on joining the competition in the first place. Guy also appears in the manga adaptation of Street Fighter Alpha by Masahiko Nakahira, where he is depicted as a well-known vigilante ninja credited with bringing an end to several criminal organisations. Guy disguised himself as a member of Shadaloo to face M. Bison, but he is forced to reveal his identity when Vega tries to kill both Adon and a possessed Ryu. After making quick work of Vega, Guy kicks several oil drums at Ryu (a nod to the Final Fight series), then proceeds to fight Ryu. Due to Guy's superior speed and training to fight multiple enemies at once, Guy is able to block every attack from Ryu's Shun Goku Satsu and defeat him. He is last seen watching over the battle between Ryu and Sagat.

Design and gameplay
Guy's character was created and originally designed by Akira "Akiman" Yasuda, who felt that it was a Capcom company tradition to often feature a ninja character, even in the Western-themed game Gun.Smoke. His work-in-progress name was simply "Ninja", inspired by the actor Sho Kosugi who often played ninja characters during the 1980s. According to Capcom's Tatsuya Minami, Guy was included in Street Fighter because he was extremely popular and easy to translate to the one-on-one fighting genre.

Each of the three fighters of the original Final Fight have their own unique characteristics, with Guy being the fastest of the three due to his ninjutsu skills. One of his most novel techniques in the game is the "Off-the-Wall Kick" which allows Guy to bounce off the wall with a jump kick. He wears the kanji  embroidered into his shinobi shozoku. His speech and mannerisms are characterized by a stiff formality. In Street Fighter Alpha, Guy's character design was altered slightly, with his jika-tabi replaced by sneakers (a change that was retained when Guy was brought back into the Final Fight series in Final Fight 3), although his fighting style mimics that of his Final Fight counterpart. Guy's new design would be used in Final Fight 3 and, along with Cody's Street Fighter Alpha rendition, is also hidden characters in Final Fight One (Final Fight for the Game Boy).

Guy's fighting style can be described as a fusion of traditional ninjutsu with modern street brawling, and is also the only Final Fight character in the Street Fighter Alpha series not to use a weapon (though he can throw a close-ranged burst of ki and shuriken in Final Fight 3 and Final Fight Revenge respectively). In Final Fight 3 and Namco × Capcom, Guy had in his repertoire a "fireball" style attack, although it dissipates a short distance from his palm. According to Street Fighter IV developer Taisaku Okada, Guy is a character that does not use "ki" and thus has no use for fireballs or projectiles. In Namco × Capcom, he participates in the Multiple Assault attacks that involve all of the Commando Team.

In Street Fighter Alpha 2, Guy was one of the few characters who could perform chain combos after they were removed. According to Expert Gamer, the player using Guy in Alpha 3 should play defensively, as Guy takes a lot of damage when he is hit, and to rely on Guy's speed and varied attacks. In a guide to Super Street Fighter IV: 3D Edition, GameSpy stated that "Guy is a frantic fighter. As he is without a fireball and effective zoning tools, he requires very aggressive, close-up fighting where he can land quick combos to chew into the opponent's health. This constantly forward-moving action makes Guy vulnerable to counter hits, but he's got enough variety in his tool set to make it work." According to MTV Multiplayer, similar to Ibuki, "Guy requires an expert. His punches and kicks, while dazzling and lengthy, require precision. They also require an eye for patterns and combination opportunities, so stay frosty. Without those things in mind, you'll find Guy to be nothing more than a poor but fast damage dealer."

Reception
Since his debut in 1989, Guy became a popular character in the fighting game fandom. In the Japanese coin-operated video game magazine Gamest, Guy was ranked second in the top characters of the year poll for 1990 (with Cody at seventh, Poison at 26th, Sodom at 33rd, and Jessica at 40th) and ranked at 26th place in the same poll for 1996. In 2001, an editor of GameSpot named Guy as his personal favourite and called him "the best character in the world". In 2002, Guy was voted the 16th most popular out of 85 Street Fighter characters in Capcom's own poll for the 15th anniversary of Street Fighter. IGN ranked Guy 24th in their top Street Fighter characters list in 2009, while UGO.com ranked him 30th on a similar list in 2010, and The Guardian gave him the high seventh place in the list compiled by Ryan Hart, the UK's top SF player. In 2012, Complex ranked him as the seventh swiftest ninja in games. In a 2018 worldwide poll by Capcom, Guy was voted 20th most popular Street Fighter character (out of 109).

Guy also became often one of the characters most requested to be added to the Capcom games' characters rosters. On the official Capcom forums, he was most requested Final Fight character to be added to the roster of Street Fighter IV, as well as the second most requested character overall to be added to the game. In 2009, GamesRadar too included him in the list of 12 fighters they would like to see in Super Street Fighter IV. According to the game's developers Takashi Tsukamoto and Taisaku Okada, they have "compiled a list of characters that players wanted to see in the game [and] Guy was one of the names on the first list" in both Japan and America ("he's pretty popular overseas as well") and the development team "also wanted to get Guy in the game". He also ranked 10th on the list of top 55 most requested Marvel vs. Capcom 3 DLC characters in a poll by Nico Nico Douga in 2010. In the English-language survey by Namco, Guy was less popular than in Japan and was the 23rd most requested Street Fighter side character to be added to the roster of Tekken X Street Fighter. He also entered the Guinness World Records Gamer's Edition'' as the first beat-'em-up game character to be included in a 2D fighting game.

See also
Ninja in popular culture

References

Capcom protagonists
Characters designed by Akira Yasuda
Fictional Japanese American people
Fictional Japanese people in video games
Fictional gangsters
Fictional immigrants to the United States
Fictional martial artists in video games
Fictional Ninjutsu practitioners
Fictional vegan and vegetarian characters
Final Fight characters
Male characters in video games
Ninja characters in video games
Street Fighter characters
Video game characters based on real people
Video game characters introduced in 1989
Vigilante characters in video games